Grace Congregational United Church of Christ is a Protestant church located in Rutland, Vermont.  Its address is 8 Court Street.

History
The church's congregation first gathered in 1788 as East Parish Congregational Church.  The current church building was completed in 1860, overseen by a committee under John B. Page during the pastorship of Rev. Silas Aiken.  Since then, the church building has undergone numerous renovations including the Aeolian Skinner organ being added in 1939 and the fellowship hall and "church school" wing in 1961. The church is currently affiliated with the United Church of Christ.

References

External links
Website

Buildings and structures in Rutland, Vermont
Churches in Rutland County, Vermont
United Church of Christ churches in Vermont
1860 establishments in Vermont